Pyotr (Cheshuin) Tayozhny (1887 – 1952) was a Russian sculptor. He studied at the Artistic Industrial School in Yekaterinburg together with his close friend, sculptor Ivan Shadr. 
Later he worked with Faberge in Moscow. Discouraged by the turmoil that followed the 1917 October revolution, he left Moscow with his wife and two daughters and settled for several years in the Altay region. His pseyudanym "Tayozhny" comes from those rural years, it originates from the word taiga. In the 1920s, after returning to the capital, Pyotr Tayozhny together with Shadr was one of the authors of the first designs of the order of Lenin, the highest Soviet award. He later specialised in miniature pieces for book covers which included Bas-reliefs of Soviet leaders, including Joseph Stalin and writers, including Aleksandr Pushkin, Maksim Gorky, Gustave Flaubert, as well as medals, one of them depicting Vladimir Lenin lying in state. The medal is now a collector's item and a good example of the 1920s Soviet cultural propaganda.

1887 births
1952 deaths
Sculptors from the Russian Empire
Soviet sculptors